Delfim Carlos de Carvalho (13 April 1825 – 19 May 1896), the Baron of Passagem, was a Brazilian naval officer who fought in the Paraguayan War. He was a Chief of Division at the Battle of Riachuelo.  He commanded the squadron that effected the Passage of Humaitá on 19 February 1868. He was also a member of the Supreme Military Justice in 1891.

References

Citations

Bibliography
Archivo Nobiliarchico Brasileiro at https://archive.org/stream/archivonobiliarc00vascuoft#page/32/mode/2up p. 341.

Brazilian military personnel of the Paraguayan War
Brazilian nobility
1825 births
1896 deaths